The Arroyo de la India Muerta is a river of Uruguay.

See also
List of rivers of Uruguay

References
Rand McNally, The New International Atlas, 1993.
 GEOnet Names Server 

Rivers of Uruguay